In linguistics, mirativity, initially proposed by Scott DeLancey, is a grammatical category in a language, independent of evidentiality, that encodes the speaker's surprise or the unpreparedness of their mind. Grammatical elements that encode the semantic category of mirativity are called miratives (abbreviated ).

DeLancey (1997) first promoted the mirative as a cross-linguistic category, identifying Turkish, Hare, Sunwar, Lhasa Tibetan, and Korean as languages exhibiting this category. Citing DeLancey as a predecessor, many researchers have reported miratives in other languages, especially Tibeto-Burman languages. However, Lazard (1999) and Hill (2012) question the validity of this category, Lazard finding that the category cannot be distinguished from a mediative, and Hill finds the evidence given by DeLancey and by Aikhenvald (2004) either incorrect or insufficient. DeLancey (2012) promotes Hare, Kham, and Magar as clear cases of miratives, conceding that his analysis of Tibetan had been incorrect. He makes no mention of Turkish, Sunwar, or Korean. Hill (2015) provides an alternative analysis of Hare, re-analyzing DeLancey's evidence for 'mirativity' as direct evidentiality. 

Albanian has a series of verb forms called miratives or admiratives. These may express surprise on the part of the speaker, but may also have other functions, such as expressing irony, doubt, or reportedness. They may therefore sometimes be translated using the English "apparently".

References

 
 
 
 
 
 
 
 
 
 Yliniemi, Juha. (2021). Similarity of mirative and contrastive focus: three parameters for describing attention markers. Linguistic Typology.

External links

Summary of mirative postings at LinguistList (includes bibliography)

Grammatical moods
Semantics
Formal semantics (natural language)